Parathyastus is a genus of longhorn beetles of the subfamily Lamiinae, containing the following species:

 Parathyastus alboconspersus Aurivillius, 1913
 Parathyastus flavoguttatus Breuning, 1956

References

Lamiini